Paulina Olegovna Andreeva (born 12 October 1988) is a Russian actress. Her notable acting roles have included the Russian television series The Method (debut: 2015), and the Netflix science fiction production, Better than Us.

Biography
Ekaterina "Paulina" Olegovna Andreeva was born in Leningrad (Now in St. Petersburg), Russian SFSR, Soviet Union. She studied dance. After high school, she entered the faculty of journalism of Saint Petersburg State University, studied for two years and moved to Moscow, where she entered the Moscow Art Theatre School (named after Chekhov).

Career
Andreeva has been active as an actress since 2011. Her notable acting roles include the Russian television series The Method (debut, 2015), and The Thaw (2013). The Netflix science fiction production, Better than Us (2018–present), starring Andreeva, is the first Netflix Original from Russia, and was described by Brad Newsome of the Sydney Morning Herald as "handsomely, thoughtfully made".

Andreeva also has a singing career.

Filmography

Film

Television

References

Further reading and viewing
  Describes the title subject's role and performance in Better than Us.
 Russian Actress Paulina Andreeva During The 68th Cannes Film Festival, Getty Images, Retrieved 6 April 2016.

External links
 

1988 births
Living people
Actresses from Saint Petersburg
21st-century Russian actresses
Russian film actresses
Russian television actresses
Moscow Art Theatre School alumni
Russian activists against the 2022 Russian invasion of Ukraine